Dot and the Whale is an Australian animated film from 1986. It is based on the character Dot from the animated film Dot and the Kangaroo (1977), which in turn was based on the children's book of the same name by Ethel Pedley.

Plot
The film starts off with a scene from the novel Moby Dick, with a whaler on a stormy sea in the 19th century, chasing "the white whale". It turns out that the scene comes from the imagination of Dot, while she is sitting with the book. She goes out to play with Nelson the dolphin in his pool, and he teaches her how to stay underwater for long periods of time and to communicate underwater, as well as the history and evolution of sea creatures.

While they play together, Nelson hears the wail of a beached whale named "Tonga" from the local coast, and jumps out of his pool, over the cliff beside, and dives into the ocean on the other side, to check what is going on, with Dot coming along. Dot walks up on land to talk with Tonga, but becomes upset as two boys, Alex and Owen, stand and throw sand on the whale. The boys say that they only want to push the whale back to the sea. Together, they try to push Tonga back to the water, but fail. They decide to gather as many kids as possible, in order to help the whale as much as they can.

While Alex and Owen start to gather help, Dot sits beside Tonga, trying to converse. Tonga explains that her family has been killed by whalers, and she is the only survivor, but has lost the will to live. Dot explains that she and others want to help Tonga, and tries to by having Tonga placed in the same pool as Nelson to let her recover. Dot then realizes that they do not have a transport facility for a whale. Meanwhile, a crooked fishmonger becomes interested in Tonga as a possible "fish" source.

As Dot wonders what she should do, Nelson tells her about Moby Dick the sperm whale (whom he explains actually existed, and is not just a fictional figure), and suggests Dot ask him if he could convince Tonga to return to the sea. Nelson believes that Tonga would obey Moby Dick, as he is a very wise old whale with great influence in the sea. Dot accepts, and they starts their journey to Antarctica, where Moby Dick sometimes sleeps. After a long adventure, Dot and Nelson reach Antarctica and meet the aged and wrinkly whale, but Moby Dick will not ask Tonga to return to the sea. He believes that if Tonga wishes to die, they should let her do so, instead of returning her to the sea and perhaps end up as another victim to whalers. However, due to the kindness of the town's children, Tonga has renewed her desire to stay alive.

Dot returns from the sea and makes up a new plan with Alex and Owen in order to save Tonga, and let her share the pool with Nelson. They start to phone different transportation companies, to see if they could help them to move a whale, but with poor results. As they finally find a company which can help them (in return for a big sum of money), they face the problem of lacking payment. So they start a campaign to fund raise, in order to save the whale.

Unfortunately, the fishmonger decides to steal the collected gain. He succeeds, but is stopped thanks to the boss of the transport company. The following day, Tonga moves to her new home. In a short epilogue, it is explained that Tonga's health improved so much, that she eventually returned to the sea.

Voices
Robyn Moore - Dot, Tonga, Alex, Misc.
Keith Scott - Nelson, Owen, Moby Dick, Misc.
Kim Deacon - Singer

Production

Reception

External links

Dot and the Whale at Oz Movies

1986 films
1980s Australian animated films
1980s children's animated films
1980s musical films
Animated films based on children's books
Australian animated feature films
Australian children's adventure films
Australian children's musical films
Films directed by Yoram Gross
Films scored by Guy Gross
Films with live action and animation
1980s English-language films
Flying Bark Productions films